Line 4 is an east-west line on the Nanjing Metro, running from  to . The line color is purple, and it first opened on January 18, 2017.

Opening timeline

Station list

Future plans
The second phase of the line will extended it to Zhenzhuquan station. A further extension to Nanjing North railway station is under planning.

References

External links 
Line 4 on the official Nanjing Metro website (includes route map) 

Nanjing Metro lines
2017 establishments in China
Railway lines opened in 2017